Claudia Anne Irena Winkleman (born 15 January 1972) is an English television presenter, radio personality, film critic and journalist. Between 2004 and 2010, she presented Strictly Come Dancing: It Takes Two on weeknights on BBC Two. Since 2010, she has co-presented Strictly Come Dancings main results show on Sunday nights with Tess Daly on BBC One and since 2014 has been a main co-host alongside Daly on the Saturday night live shows, following the departure of Sir Bruce Forsyth. She has twice been nominated for the British Academy Television Award for Best Entertainment Performance for her work on Strictly Come Dancing.

Winkleman was also the presenter of the BBC's Film..., replacing Jonathan Ross after his move to ITV in 2010. She was the co-presenter of Let's Sing and Dance for its first two series with Steve Jones. From 2013 and 2016 she presented the BBC Two series The Great British Sewing Bee. In 2022, Winkleman fronted the BBC reality show The Traitors. 

Her trademark appearance includes heavy eyeliner and black hair with a characteristic fringe; she has said "I don't think I'd have a career if I didn't have a fringe".

Early life and education
Winkleman was born in London to a Jewish family and she has no full siblings.  Her parents divorced when she was three, both remarrying four years later. Her mother, Eve Pollard, married Nicholas Lloyd, becoming Lady Lloyd in 1990. Winkleman's father later married children's author Cindy Black.

Winkleman's half-sister from her father's second marriage is actress Sophie Winkleman, who is married to Lord Frederick Windsor. She also has a half-brother, Oliver Lloyd, from her mother's second marriage. Raised in Hampstead, London, Winkleman was educated at the City of London School for Girls and New Hall, Cambridge, obtaining a Master of Arts in Art History.

Television career

1991–2000
In 1992, she began appearing frequently in the long-running BBC series Holiday, and this continued throughout the mid-1990s. This culminated in a special documentary in which she travelled around the world for 34 days reporting from Japan, India, Costa Rica and Dubai. Throughout this period, she appeared as a reporter on other shows, particularly This Morning interviewing various celebrities. During the late 1990s, Winkleman presented a number of programmes on smaller digital channels. She had a stint on the cable channel L!VE TV, but soon left to pursue other projects. In 1996, Winkleman hosted Granada programmes God's Gift (taking over from Davina McCall) and Pyjama Party (co-hosted with Katie Puckrik and Michelle Kelly).

Winkleman also presented a number of gameshows including the dating show Three's a Crowd, LWT show Talking Telephone Numbers, the second series of Granada TV show God's Gift and Fanorama. In 1997 she was the co-host of children's Saturday morning TV show Tricky. She was also an occasional team captain on a gameshow called HeadJam, hosted by Vernon Kay.

2001–2006
Winkleman's first major television job was in 2001, on the regional discussion programme Central Weekend.  Between 2002 and 2004, Winkleman began her first daily TV role when she hosted the BBC Three Entertainment update show Liquid News, taking over from Christopher Price on the now defunct BBC Choice. She shared the presenting duties with Colin Paterson, and later Paddy O'Connell. The show featured celebrity interviews.

In 2003, Fame Academy appointed Winkleman to present a daily update show on BBC Three, in conjunction with its second series. She repeated the show in 2005 for the much shorter celebrity version Comic Relief Does Fame Academy. Also in 2005, Winkleman co-hosted The House of Tiny Tearaways, a BBC Three reality TV show. She also began hosting Strictly Come Dancing: It Takes Two, a supplementary programme to Strictly Come Dancing, taking over from Justin Lee-Collins.

Winkleman then presented several more reality shows including End of Story, and Art School.

2007–2012
Winkleman presented many prime time programmes. In 2007, she took over from Cat Deeley as the main host for the third series of Comic Relief Does Fame Academy, co-hosting with Patrick Kielty. She co-hosted the inaugural Eurovision Dance Contest 2007 alongside Graham Norton for BBC One in September of that year and again in 2008. She co-presented the UK selection process for the Eurovision Song Contest 2008 called Eurovision: Your Decision, this time accompanied by Eurovision stalwart Terry Wogan. In March 2008, Winkleman rekindled her partnership with Kielty when the pair hosted the final leg of Sport Relief 2008.

In 2007, Winkleman was the face of Sky Movie Premiere's coverage of the 79th Academy Awards, repeating it for the 80th Academy Awards in 2008. The show was broadcast live in conjunction with the ceremony itself, running right through the night into the early hours of the morning. Winkleman has made many guest appearances on panel and talk shows, including: Never Mind the Buzzcocks, Would I Lie to You?, Have I Got News for You, Friday Night with Jonathan Ross and Lily Allen and Friends. In February 2008, she appeared on the British version of the comedy improvisational show Thank God You're Here, hosted by Paul Merton.

Winkleman narrated the 2008 BBC Three show Glamour Girls, a documentary series about glamour modelling in Britain.

In March 2009, Winkleman was announced as the host of the new series of Hell's Kitchen on ITV1. She fronted the nightly show live from the restaurant in East London in its fourth series in the spring. On 14 November 2009, she appeared on the main show of Strictly Come Dancing to present backstage, due to main presenter Bruce Forsyth being on sick leave. She co-hosted the show with Tess Daly and guest presenter Ronnie Corbett.

On 29 March 2010, she was named as one of the new co-presenters of the Film programme, replacing Jonathan Ross. The Guardian stated, through her recent hosting of Sky Television's coverage of The Oscars, Winkleman had "proved both a passionate and engaging advocate of cinema", while her husband Kris Thykier is a film producer with credits on several mainstream releases.

2013–present
On 2 April 2013, Winkleman began presenting the BBC Two sewing competition The Great British Sewing Bee, until 2016. The show went off air for 2017, but was brought back in 2018, with Joe Lycett replacing Winkleman as presenter. 

In 2015, she appeared on The Big Fat Anniversary Quiz.  In May 2015, she appeared on an episode of Watchdog on BBC One in which she discussed, during a segment on dangerous Halloween costumes, that the previous year her daughter had been badly burned when the costume she was wearing caught fire.  In November 2016, Winkleman presented the one-off BBC special Bublé at the BBC with Michael Bublé.

From 2018, she presented Britain's Best Home Cook and The Makeover Show for BBC One. In May 2018, Winkleman co-presented The Biggest Weekend on BBC Two and BBC Radio 2.

In 2023, Winkleman is to host a new Channel 4 competition show The Piano which will give amateur pianists the chance to perform at London's Royal Festival Hall.

Strictly Come Dancing

Strictly Come Dancing: It Takes Two was devised as a companion show to run conjoined with the second series of Strictly Come Dancing, and continues to run to date. It follows a similar format to the one Winkleman made popular on Fame Academy, and sees the presenter deliberating and dissecting the ins and outs of the main competition, accompanied by an array of dance experts, assorted guests and the competitors themselves. The show is aired every weekday at 6:30 pm on BBC Two throughout the course of the series.

Strictly Come Dancing: It Takes Two was originally hosted by Winkleman since its inception. In 2011, former contestant Zoe Ball took over as host from Winkleman.

In 2010, Winkleman became co-host of the Sunday night results show of Strictly Come Dancing, presenting alongside Tess Daly. In 2014, Winkleman's role on Strictly Come Dancing expanded to presenting the main show, following the departure of Bruce Forsyth.

Writing
Winkleman started her journalism career as a travel writer, writing columns about her various worldwide excursions. She did so in The Sunday Times and The Independent, but also contributed to the free daily London paper Metro in a similar capacity. As her television career and family evolved, she travelled less, and began to write more general work, opinion-led lifestyle journalism about womanhood, sex and relationships. She wrote for Cosmopolitan and Tatler amongst others. Between 2005 and 2008, she wrote a regular weekly column for The Independent called Take It From Me.

Radio work
In April and May 2008, Winkleman hosted a six-part comedy quiz series taking a humorous look into the week's celebrity gossip, called Hot Gossip. The show was broadcast on a Saturday afternoon on BBC Radio 2; points were awarded to those who dished out dirt. The show featured many famous pundits, including Will Smith, Phil Nichol, Jo Caulfield, Rufus Hound and Jonathan Ross' brother, Paul.

She hosted a weekly show on BBC Radio 2 every Friday night between 10pm and midnight called Claudia Winkleman's Arts Show consisting of interviews with people from the arts world, as well as reviews and debate. In July 2010, Winkleman sat in for Dermot O'Leary. She covered for Ken Bruce on several occasions from 2012 until 2014.

In April 2016, she began presenting her own Sunday night show on BBC Radio 2 called Claudia on Sunday from 7 to 9pm. In June 2017, Winkleman covered for Steve Wright in the Afternoon from 2 to 5pm. 

In 2020, Claudia on Sunday was displaced from the schedules and subsequently ended due to the Coronavirus pandemic. It was announced on 23 November 2020 that Winkleman had taken over the Saturday mid-morning slot on BBC Radio 2 from Graham Norton.

Charity and other work
In 2007, she answered telephones at the BT Tower for the Disasters Emergency Committee in response to problems in Darfur. In May 2007, she helped relaunch The National Missing Persons Campaign, and also supported a Christmas campaign by the charity Refuge, which aimed to stop domestic violence.

In June 2008, Winkleman was featured in Heat magazine with no make-up on, as part of a stand against the excessive airbrushing of prominent women, which she described as "pretty terrifying".

On 18 March 2011, Winkleman was one of the presenters of BBC's Comic Relief. In 2012, she was one of the judges and the host of the FilmNation shorts at the British Film Institute, which as part of the Cultural Olympiad for London 2012, encouraged young people aged 14–25 to get involved in film making.

Personal life
In June 2000, Winkleman married film producer Kris Thykier at Marylebone Town Hall. The couple have three children.

On 31 October 2014, Winkleman's then eight-year-old daughter was taken to hospital after being seriously injured when her Halloween costume caught fire. Winkleman stated that the costume brushed against a candle in a pumpkin.  This incident prompted the government to tighten the flame retardant standards of Halloween costumes.

Filmography
Television

Radio

References

External links

Claudia Winkleman (BBC Radio 2)

Claudia Winkleman's Independent column

1972 births
Living people
21st-century English women writers
Alumni of New Hall, Cambridge
BBC Radio 2 presenters
Strictly Come Dancing
English Jews
English journalists
English radio presenters
English television presenters
English women non-fiction writers
People educated at the City of London School for Girls
Jewish women writers
People from Hampstead
British women radio presenters